Mike Abayomi Bamiloye is a Nigerian gospel film actor, dramatist, producer, and director.

He is an evangelist and the founder and president of the film production company Mount Zion Faith Ministries. and Mount Zion Television.

Biography
Mike Bamiloye was born in Ilesa, a town in Osun State in southwestern Nigeria on April 13, 1960 but hails from Ijebu-Ijesa in Osun State. He was trained at Divisional Teachers’ Training College at Ipetumodu where he began his career.
Bamiloye founded Mount Zion on 5 August 1985.
Bamiloye's debut drama Hell in Conference was staged at the National Christian Teachers Conference in 1986 at Ilesa in Osun State. He has featured, produced, and directed several Nigerian gospel films over the years. A movie that explains his early life and the beginning of his ministry was released in 2020 to celebrate his 60th birthday.

Personal life
Mike Bamiloye is married to Gloria Bamiloye, a Nigerian film actress and evangelist. They have two sons, Christian film maker and producer Damilola Mike-Bamiloye, Joshua Mike-Bamiloye, a daughter Darasimi Gomba-Oyor, and four grand-children.
Mike and Gloria Bamiloye married on 8 October 1988.

Filmography

See also
List of Yoruba people

References

Living people
Nigerian male film actors
Nigerian film directors
Nigerian film producers
Actors from Osun State
Nigerian Pentecostal pastors
Nigerian Pentecostals
21st-century Nigerian male actors
Yoruba male actors
Male actors from Ilesha
Nigerian Christian clergy
Yoruba Christian clergy
People from Osun
Nigerian dramatists and playwrights
1960 births